The leader of the Opposition in British Columbia is the member of the Legislative Assembly (MLA) in the Legislative Assembly of British Columbia who leads the political party recognized as the Official Opposition. This position generally goes to the leader of the largest party in the Legislative Assembly that is not in government.

Notes

References

British Columbia
Politics of British Columbia
Lists of political office-holders in British Columbia